, or simply Starzan S, is an anime created by Tatsunoko Productions from an idea by veteran studio director Hiroshi Sasagawa.

The series is a "mixture of Star Wars and Tarzan".

Canceled at only 34 episodes due to low ratings, the series was one of the Tatsunoko studio's more obscure works until the series was released on video in Japan on Blu-ray by TC Entertainment in 2017. 

"Okawari" is a Japanese expression used when the user is requesting a second helping of food or drink.

Plot
There is a planet in the galactic system named Kirakira which is rich in natural greens, and there live two main tribes on the planet namely Senobi and Robot. The former live in the wooded region while the latter inhabit the desert area, who are anxious to move to and settle on the woodland for better lives. This desire causes incessant strife around the border zones. The Senobi tribe love nature and want to live in peace without being harassed by the others. On the other hand, the formerly high-tech Robot tribe have become militant as they want to expand their sphere of influence from the desert to the wooded region. A young hero of the Senobi tribe together with his supporters makes efforts to stop the feud between the two tribes and to help them live in peace.

Cast
 Kazuhiko Inoue as Hoshio Yumeno / Starzan S
 Yumi Takada as Jun Yagami
 Kuniko Kashii – Maneko
 Tesshō Genda – Eveelz
 Kazue Komiya – Leeds, Mewtan
 Shin Aomori – Hachiro
 Tōru Ōhira – Darth Bellow
 Daisuke Gōri – Iron Man Ultra Z
 Kumiko Takizawa – Matka
 Ryūji Saikachi – Obiwan Senobi
 Sanae Shinohara – Odin Bow
 Takashi Taguchi – Ebiten Senobi
 Keiko Tomochika – Kakasan Senobi
 Nobuo Tanaka – Narrator

Design 
 Studio " Ammonite " (Hiroshi Ogawa, Hiroshi Okura, and Takashi Ono.)

Episodes

References

External links
 

1984 anime television series debuts
Adventure anime and manga
Fuji TV original programming
Science fiction anime and manga
Tatsunoko Production